Nicole Renée, also sometimes known as Nicole Renée Harris, is an American singer, songwriter, record producer and former Teen Summit host, who is currently signed to Melodious Fool Records. Her latest single release is "You Don't Have To Buy Me Anything". Previous releases included a self-titled album on Atlantic Records in 1998. She was signed by Craig Kallman and Ahmet Ertegun. Prior to recording it, Renee wrote more than 200 songs.

Renée was trained by Gail Thomas who attended the Juilliard School. She is trained in classical music.

Renée has also contributed her songwriting talents to the works of other artists. Her contributions include penning the song "All Night All Day" by Chantay Savage, "Medicine" by Elusion, "I Thought I Told You" by Anastacia, "Let Me Know" by Keystone and "Criminal" by Tyrese. She has also written for Deborah Cox, "Things Just Ain't The Same", plus Forte, 702, Coco Lee, and Planet Soul.

References

Year of birth missing (living people)
Living people
Juilliard School alumni
Atlantic Records artists
American rhythm and blues singer-songwriters
Musicians from Philadelphia
Singer-songwriters from Pennsylvania
People from Middletown, Delaware
American contemporary R&B singers